Mark Knowles and Daniel Nestor were the defending champions.

Bob Bryan and Mike Bryan won in the final 6–4, 6–4, against Knowles and Nestor.

Seeds
All seeds receive a bye into the second round.

Draw

Finals

Top half

Bottom half

External links
 Draw

2004 Stella Artois Championships